Stears Business is a Nigerian business publication based between Lagos and London with a focus on business, economic and political news. Stears Business is published by Stears and its journalists are predominantly based in Lagos.  As of September 2017, the Editor-in-Chief was Michael Famoroti.

The publication takes a neutral editorial stance in its analysis of government, free trade and globalisation as it believes in 'the value of permitting all inoffensive ideologies in informing debate'. The editorial board is composed of alumni of the London School of Economics and is particularly focused on Africa.

Stears raised $3.3 million in funding round from MaC Venture Capital, the investment firm of retired tennis star Serena Williams, Melo 7 Tech Partners, Omidyar Group's Laminate Fund and Cascador.

References

Nigerian news websites
Business newspapers
Mass media in Lagos